Forever is the second studio album of American hip hop recording artist Puff Daddy, released on August 24, 1999 by Bad Boy Records and Arista Records. The album rose to No. 2 on the Billboard 200 album chart. Forever has also been certified platinum in the US by the RIAA.

The album was a commercial success, selling 205,343 copies in its first week and debuting at number two on the US Billboard 200 chart, despite receiving generally mixed reviews from critics.

Overview
This was the first Sean Combs album released under the name of "Puff Daddy", as his debut album was released under "Puff Daddy & the Bad Boy Family".

Forever received mixed reviews from most music critics, with criticism directed at the commercialization of hip-hop music, specifically this albums more pop dance sound and lacklustre lyrics compared to its predecessor, which caused controversy at the time. In 2006, Q magazine included Forever in their list of the 50 worst albums of all time.

Background and production
Nearly two years following the release of his first collaboration album, No Way Out, which debuted on the US Billboard 200 at number one and won the Grammy Award for Best Rap Album in February 1998, whereas Combs (under the name "Puff Daddy"), was nominated for Best New Artist, which he lost. He also collaborated with Jimmy Page of Led Zeppelin, for the single "Come with Me" for the 1998 film Godzilla. The song reached #2 on the UK Singles Chart and #4 on the US Billboard Hot 100. During the summer of 1998, the recording for Combs' debut album began, continuing the following year.

Critical reception

Commercial performance
Forever debuted at number 2 on the Billboard 200, selling 205,343 copies behind Christina Aguilera's self-titled album with first week sales of 252,800 copies. The album opened at the top spot of the Top R&B/Hip-Hop Albums chart. In the United Kingdom, the album peaked at number nine on the UK Albums Chart. The album debuted at number one on the UK R&B Chart. In Canada, the album opened at number four on the Canadian Albums Chart, becoming Combs' highest charting album in the country. As of September 24, 1999, Forever has been certified platinum by the Recording Industry Association of America (RIAA), for selling 1,000,000 copies.

Track listing
Credits adapted from the album's liner notes.

Sample credits
 "Journey Through the Life" contains a sample of "For the Good Times" written by Kris Kristofferson as performed by Al Green.
 "I'll Do This for You" contains a sample of "Get Off" written by Carl Driggs and Ish Ledesma as performed by Foxy.
 "Do You Want It... Do You Like It..." contains an interpolation of "Wanna Get Paid" as performed by LL Cool J and the Lost Boyz.   
 "I Hear Voices" contains a sample of "Bamboo Child" by Ryo Kawasaki.
 "Fake Thugs Dedication" samples "Paper Thin" written by Lana Michelle Moorer and Freddie Byrd as performed by MC Lyte and "Shining Star" written by Maurice White, Larry Dunn and Philip Bailey as performed by Earth, Wind & Fire.
 "Angels With Dirty Faces" samples "Fantasy" written by Maurice White, Verdine White and Eddie del Barrio as performed by Earth, Wind & Fire.
 "Satisfy You" samples "I Got 5 On It" written by Jerold Dwight Ellis III and Garrick Husbands as performed by Luniz, "Why You Treat Me So Bad" written by Denzil Foster, Jay King and Thomas McElroy as performed by Club Nouveau and "Sexual Healing"  written by Marvin Gaye and Odell Brown as performed by Gaye. 
 "P.E. 2000" contains a sample of "Public Enemy No.1" written by Carlton Douglas Ridenhour and Hank Shocklee as performed by Public Enemy and "Blow Your Head" written by Fred Wesley and James Brown as performed by Wesley and the J.B.'s.
 "Best Friend" contains a sample of "Sailing" written and performed by Christopher Cross.
 "Pain (Forever)" contains a sample of "Benjamin" written and performed by Les McCann and "Children's Story" 
 "Reverse" contains a sample of "Romeo" by the Dynamic Superiors.
 "Real Niggas" contains a sample of "Real Niggaz" written by Christopher Wallace as performed by the Notorious B.I.G.

Charts

Weekly charts

Year-end charts

Certifications and sales

Singles

See also
 List of number-one R&B albums of 1999 (U.S.)

References

1999 albums
Sean Combs albums
Bad Boy Records albums
Albums produced by Sean Combs